The Southeast Anatolia Region (Turkish: Güneydoğu Anadolu Bölgesi) (TRC) is a statistical region in Turkey.

Subregions and provinces 

 Gaziantep Subregion (TRC1)
 Gaziantep Province (TRC11)
 Adıyaman Province (TRC12)
 Kilis Province (TRC13)
 Şanlıurfa Subregion (TRC2)
 Şanlıurfa Province (TRC21)
 Diyarbakır Province (TRC22)
 Mardin Subregion (TRC3)
 Mardin Province (TRC31)
 Batman Province (TRC32)
 Şırnak Province (TRC33)
 Siirt Province (TRC34)

Population

Age groups

Internal immigration

State register location of Southeast Anatolia residents

Marital status of 15+ population by gender

Education status of 15+ population by gender

See also 
 NUTS of Turkey

References

External links 
 TURKSTAT

Sources 
 ESPON Database

Statistical regions of Turkey